, also known as , was a poet, an official in the Imperial court of Emperor Fushimi, and a senior bureaucrat of the Kamakura shogunate.

Tamekane was the grandson of poet Fujiwara no Tameie.

In the Imperial Daijō-kan, he rose to the rank of Chūnagon and Dainagon.

In 1298, he was banished to Sado Island.  Later, this exile was modified to  banishment in Tosa province.

In 1312 he compiled the Gyokuyō Wakashū.

Selected works
In a statistical overview derived from writings by and about Kyōgoku Tamekane, OCLC/WorldCat encompasses roughly 10+ works in 30+ publications in 2 languages and 400+ library holdings.

 玉葉和歌集 (1647)
 訳注為兼卿和哥抄 (1963)
 為兼・為相等書狀並案 (1988)

See also
 Gyokuyō Wakashū

Notes

References
 Nussbaum, Louis-Frédéric and Käthe Roth. (2005).  Japan encyclopedia. Cambridge: Harvard University Press. ;  OCLC 58053128
 
 Titsingh, Isaac. (1834).  Annales des empereurs du Japon (Nihon Odai Ichiran).  Paris: Royal Asiatic Society, Oriental Translation Fund of Great Britain and Ireland. OCLC 5850691

Japanese poets